Phulpur is a town and a nagar panchayat in Azamgarh district in the Indian state of Uttar Pradesh.

Geography
It has an average elevation of 81 metres (265 feet).

Demographics
 India census, Phulpur had a population of 8,310. Males constitute 51% of the population and females 49%. Phulpur has an average literacy rate of 63%, higher than the national average of 59.5%: male literacy is 69%, and female literacy is 57%. In Phulpur, 18% of the population is under 6 years of age.

Administration
The chairman of the Phulpur nagar panchayat is Shiv Prasad Jaiswal.

References

Cities and towns in Azamgarh district